Allison Littlejohn, FHEA, is Professor of Learning Technology at University College London. She is a director of University College London's knowledge lab and an expert in learning sciences, specialising in professional and digital learning.

Education 
Littlejohn received her PhD from the University of Strathclyde in Chemistry in 1988. Her thesis was titled A Comparative Examination of the Mechanical Properties of Sodium Nitrate and Calcite and the Influence of Defects On Their Reactivity.

Career and research

Littlejohn was appointed as Professor within the School of Education and Dean of Learning and Teaching at the College of Social Sciences at the University of Glasgow in April 2019. In November 2019 she was appointed director of University College London's knowledge lab.

Publications 
She has published on open-access learning, digital resources, massive open online courses (MOOCs), and Wikipedia editing within education:

 Allison Littlejohn and Carol Higgison, A guide for teachers (York: Learning and Teaching Support Network (LTSN), 2003)
 
 
 Allison Littlejohnn and Anoush Margaryan, Technology-enhanced professional learning : processes, practices, and tools (New York: Routledge, 2013)
 Allison Littlejohn and Chris Pegler, Reusing open resources : learning in open networks for work, life and education (London: Routledge, 2015)
 
 Victoria Murphy, Allison Littlejohn, Bart C. Rienties, (2020) 'Social network analysis and activity theory: A symbiotic relationship', Dominik E. Froehlich, Martin Rehm, and Bart C. Rienties (eds.) Mixed methods social network analysis: Theories and methodologies in learning and education (London, United Kingdom: Routledge) pp. 113–125
 Vasudha Chaudhari, Victoria Murphy, and Allison Littlejohn, (2020) 'The Educational Intelligent Economy – Lifelong Learning – A vision for the future', Tavis D. Jules, and Florin D. Salajan (eds.) The Educational Intelligent Economy: Artificial Intelligence, Machine Learning and the Internet of Things in Education. International Perspectives on Education and Society (In Press), 38. Emerald, pp. 109–126
 
 Varga-Atkins, T, Sharpe, R, Bennett, S, Alexander, S and Littlejohn. (2021). The choices that connect uncertainty and sustainability: Student-centred agile decision-making approaches used by universities in Australia and the UK during the COVID-19 pandemic. Journal of Interactive Media in Education, 1(16), pp. 1–16. DOI: https://doi.org/10.5334/jime.649

References

External links 
 
 UCL profile

Academics of University College London
Alumni of the University of Strathclyde
Living people
Year of birth missing (living people)
Scottish women academics
Place of birth missing (living people)
Academics of the University of Glasgow
Fellows of the Higher Education Academy